During the Napoleonic Wars until 1810, Sweden and Great Britain were allies in the war against Napoleon. As a result of Sweden's defeat in the Finnish War and the Pomeranian War, and the following Treaty of Fredrikshamn and Treaty of Paris, Sweden declared war on Great Britain. The bloodless war, however, existed only on paper, and Britain was still not hindered in stationing ships at the Swedish island of Hanö and trade with the Baltic states.

Background
The Treaty of Paris, concluded on 6 January 1810, forced Sweden to join the Continental System, a trade embargo against Great Britain. Since Great Britain was Sweden's biggest trade partner this caused economic difficulties, and trade continued to take place through smuggling. On 13 November that year, France delivered an ultimatum to the Swedish government demanding that within five days Sweden:
 Declare war against Great Britain,
 Confiscate all British ships in Swedish ports,
 Seize all British products in Sweden.

France and its allies threatened to declare war against Sweden if it did not meet the French demands. On 17 November the same year, the Swedish government declared war against Great Britain.

The war
No acts of war occurred during the conflict and Britain was even allowed to station boats in Hanö, thus "occupying" the island. Sweden did not try to hinder this as Britain used the island to continue trading with Sweden. The only bloodshed during the war occurred on the 15th of June 1811, when Major-General Hampus Mörner with 140 men acted to disperse a group of farmers in Klågerup in Scania who objected to the conscription policy. In the Klågerup riots, Mörner's soldiers killed 30 farmers.

Aftermath
The elected Crown Prince of Sweden, Danish Prince Charles August, had died on 28 May 1810, and on 21 August 1810, the French marshal general Jean-Baptiste Bernadotte was elected Crown Prince of Sweden. Although Bernadotte was only the Crown Prince and technically subservient to King Charles XIII, the King's deteriorating health and disinterest made the Crown Prince the de facto ruler of Sweden. Under Bernadotte's rule, Sweden's relationship with Napoleonic France deteriorated. When France occupied Swedish Pomerania and the island of Rügen in 1812, Sweden sought peace with Great Britain.

After long negotiations, the Treaty of Örebro was signed on 18 July 1812. On the same day and at the same place, Britain and Russia signed a peace treaty to end the Anglo–Russian War (1807–1812).

See also
 English Wars (Scandinavia)
 Gunboat War
 Dano-Swedish War of 1808-1809
 Pomeranian War
 Finnish War

Notes

References
 http://blog.svd.se/historia/2012/11/07/hanos-brittiska-historia/
 http://www.royalnavy.mod.uk/News-and-Events/Latest-News/2013/July/02/130702-Explorer-Pays-Respects-in-Sweden

Literature
 Norie, John William (1827) – The naval gazetteer, biographer, and chronologist; containing a history of the late wars, from their commencement in 1793 to their final conclusion in 1815; and continued, as to the biographical part, to the present time (J. W. Norie & Co) 
 Sundberg, Ulf (1998) – Svenska krig, 1521–1814 (Hjalmarson & Högberg, Stockholm) 

Swedish
Wars involving Sweden
Napoleonic Wars
1810s in Sweden
19th-century military history of the United Kingdom
1810s in the United Kingdom
Battles and conflicts without fatalities
Sweden–United Kingdom military relations
Conflicts in 1810
Conflicts in 1811
Conflicts in 1812